Orlean is a small unincorporated village in Fauquier County, Virginia, located approximately  west of Washington, DC.  Orlean is situated at the intersection of Leeds Manor Road (County Route 688) and John Barton Payne Road (County Route 732). The Orlean Post Office has the ZIP Code of 20128.

The Orlean Historic District was listed on the National Register of Historic Places in 2009.

Notable residents
 Colin S. Harris (born 1990), Democratic nominee for the Virginia House of Delegates, 2013
 Humphrey Marshall (1760-1841), politician and U.S. senator from Kentucky, 1795-1801
 John Barton Payne (1855-1935), United States Secretary of the Interior, 1920-1921

References

Unincorporated communities in Fauquier County, Virginia
Unincorporated communities in Virginia